David Holmes "Dave" Edgar (born March 27, 1950) is an American former swimmer, Olympic champion, and former world record-holder.

Edgar attended the University of Tennessee, where he swam for the Tennessee Volunteers swimming and diving team in National Collegiate Athletic Association (NCAA) and Southeastern Conference competition.  He won seven NCAA championships while swimming for the Volunteers, and was named the "Fastest Man Afloat" by Sports Illustrated magazine.

Edgar represented the United States at the 1972 Summer Olympics in Munich, Germany, where he received a gold medal in the 4×100-meter freestyle relay.  He received another gold medal in 4×100-meter freestyle relay at the 1971 Pan American Games in Cali, Colombia.  He set two world records during his career, both in the 4×100-meter freestyle relay.

Edgar was inducted into the International Swimming Hall of Fame as an "Honor Swimmer" in 1996.

See also
 List of members of the International Swimming Hall of Fame
 List of Olympic medalists in swimming (men)
 List of University of Tennessee people
 World record progression 4 × 100 metres freestyle relay

References

External links
 
 

1950 births
Living people
American male butterfly swimmers
American male freestyle swimmers
World record setters in swimming
Olympic gold medalists for the United States in swimming
Pan American Games gold medalists for the United States
Sportspeople from Fort Lauderdale, Florida
Swimmers at the 1971 Pan American Games
Swimmers at the 1972 Summer Olympics
Tennessee Volunteers men's swimmers
Medalists at the 1972 Summer Olympics
Pan American Games medalists in swimming
Medalists at the 1971 Pan American Games
20th-century American people
21st-century American people